Sinularia polydactyla, known as finger leather coral, is a species of soft coral in the family Alcyoniidae. Bio-active isolates called durumolides have been found in all samples of this coral.

References 

Alcyoniidae